Death Turns the Tables, first published in 1941 (first UK publication 1942 as The Seat of the Scornful), is a detective story by John Dickson Carr which features Carr's series detective Gideon Fell.  This novel is a mystery of the type known as a whodunnit.

Plot summary

Mr. Justice Ireton believes that, when presented with circumstantial evidence about a crime, he can unerringly penetrate to the truth.  He also believes that he can pay off handsome Anthony Morrell to break off his engagement with the judge's daughter Constance, in the hopes that Constance will marry the judge's assistant Fred Barlow (which would very much displease wealthy society girl Jane Tennant, who loves Barlow).  However, there are a few problems that will stand in the way of that arrangement; notably, that the judge is broke and Tony Morrell cannot be bought off, although he is known to enjoy exacting revenge for slights both real and imagined.  When Morrell is found dead in the Iretons' seaside cottage, a great deal of circumstantial evidence points to the judge, who cannot think of how to divert suspicion.  It takes Gideon Fell to make sense of some very unusual pieces of evidence, which include a piece of chewing gum and an overstuffed pillow marked "Souvenir of Canada", and determine how Tony Morrell met his death.

1941 American novels
Novels by John Dickson Carr
Hamish Hamilton books
Harper & Brothers books